Debipur Milan Vidyapith is a government-sponsored high school located in Debipur, Nandigram, Purba Medinipur, West Bengal, India. The school was established on 12th of January,1948.

The school is affiliated to the West Bengal Board of Secondary Education and the West Bengal Council of Higher Secondary Education.

History
Debipur Milan Vidyapith was established on January 12, 1948, in the remote region of Agadir Nandigram, in the Purba Medinipur district. The establishment of this school honored the memory of Swami Vivekananda and Arnalok of the Ushalagan.

Subjects offered
 Bengali (A) 
 English (B) 
 Mathematics
 Physics
 Chemistry
 Biology
 History
 Geography
 Sanskrit
 Philosophy
 Economics
 Computer Application

See also
 Kalikapur High School

References

External links

West Bengal Board of Secondary Education.
West Bengal Council of Higher Secondary Education

 Educational institutions established in 1948
1948 establishments in West Bengal
 Schools in Purba Medinipur district
 High schools and secondary schools in West Bengal
 Co-educational schools in India